Hanna Valley, also locally known as Shal Tungi, is a valley in Balochistan, Pakistan at a distance of  from Quetta. The people living here mostly are Kakars. Hanna Lake is located in the center of this valley.

References

Valleys of Balochistan (Pakistan)
Populated places in Quetta District